Hakea lasianthoides is a shrub or tree in the family  Proteaceae  and is endemic  to Western Australia. It has creamy-white flowers, mostly linear leaves and flowers from September  to November.

Description
It blooms from September to November and produces white-cream flowers. After flowering smooth leaf-like fruit form with a transversely elliptic shape. The seeds within have an obliquely narrowly elliptic or obovate shape with a wing down one side

Taxonomy and naming
The species was first formally described by the botanist Barbara Rye in 1984 as part of the work A new species and a new combination among the Proteaceae represented in the Perth Region as published in the journal Nuytsia. The only known synonym is Hakea lasiantha var. angustifolia.
The specific epithet is taken from the Greek words lasios meaning hairy or woolly and anthos meaning flower and -oides meaning resembling, referring to the similar appearance of the flowers to Hakea lasiantha.

Distribution
It is endemic to an area in the South West and Great Peel regions of Western Australia from Armadale in the north to Denmark in the south where it is found in damp areas and ridge tops growing in sandy-loam and gravelly soils. It is often found as part of the understorey in jarrah forest communities.

References

lasianthoides
Eudicots of Western Australia
Plants described in 1984
Taxa named by Barbara Lynette Rye